Hugo Melo Câmara Rego (born 10 November 1993) is a Portuguese footballer who plays as a midfielder.

Football career
On 30 September 2012, Rego made his professional debut with Santa Clara in a 2012–13 Segunda Liga match against UD Oliveirense.

References

External links

1993 births
Living people
People from Ponta Delgada
Portuguese footballers
Association football forwards
Liga Portugal 2 players
S.L. Benfica footballers
C.D. Santa Clara players